The West Moreton colonial by-election, 1870 was a by-election held on 25 June 1870 in the electoral district of West Moreton for the Queensland Legislative Assembly.

History
On 13 June 1870, Samuel Hodgson, member for West Moreton, resigned. John Ferrett won the resulting by-election on 25 June 1870.

See also
 Members of the Queensland Legislative Assembly, 1868–1870

References

1870 elections in Australia
Queensland state by-elections
1870s in Queensland